La favorite (The Favourite, sometimes referred to by its Italian title: La favorita) is a grand opera in four acts by Gaetano Donizetti to a French-language libretto by Alphonse Royer and Gustave Vaëz, based on the play Le comte de Comminges by Baculard d'Arnaud with additions by Eugène Scribe based on the story of Leonora de Guzman. The opera concerns the romantic struggles of the King of Castile, Alfonso XI, and his mistress, the "favourite" Leonora, against the backdrop of the political wiles of receding Moorish Spain and the life of the Catholic Church. It premiered on 2 December 1840 at the Académie Royale de Musique (Salle Le Peletier) in Paris.

Background 
Originally, Donizetti had been composing an opera by the name of Le Duc d'Albe as his second work for the Opéra in Paris. However, the director, Léon Pillet, objected to an opera without a prominent role for his mistress, mezzo-soprano Rosine Stoltz. Donizetti therefore abandoned Le Duc d'Albe and borrowed heavily from L'Ange de Nisida, an unrealized project from 1839, to create La favorite.

Donizetti wrote the entire final act in three to four hours, with the exception of the cavatina and a part of a duet, which were added at the rehearsal stage.

Performance history 
The Opéra's original production (Paris, 1840) had costumes designed by Paul Lormier and sets produced by two teams of scenic artists: René-Humanité Philastre and Charles-Antoine Cambon (acts 1 and 3), Charles Séchan, Jules Diéterle and Édouard Desplechin (acts 2 and 4). Revivals at the Palais Garnier, on 25 January 1875 and 3 February 1896, increased the scale of the staging but remained true to the original concept of 1840. The opera continued to be performed each season at the Opéra up to 1894, remaining in its repertoire until 1918, as well as maintaining a presence in the French provinces through this period.

It was revived in Padua under the title of Leonora di Guzman in 1842, and at La Scala as Elda in 1843 with Marietta Alboni in the title role, though Donizetti himself was not involved in these productions.

The London premiere was in English at Drury Lane in 1843 with soprano Emma Romer, and then in French two years later at Covent Garden, and in Italian at Her Majesty's in 1847. New Orleans' Théâtre d'Orléans first saw the piece on 9 February 1843 in French (followed by a performance in New York by the New Orleans French Opera Company), and the Metropolitan Opera mounted a production 1895. Italian revivals in the mid-20th century took place at La Scala Milan in 1934 with Ebe Stignani and Pertile, in Rome a year later with Cobelli and Gigli, followed by further revivals in both cities, several featuring Stignani in the title role. Arturo Toscanini conducted the work in Bergamo for the Donizetti centenary. In 1978, the Metropolitan Opera revived La Favorite (in Italian) with Luciano Pavarotti and Shirley Verrett; the opera had not been heard at the Met since Enrico Caruso sang it there in 1905, 73 years previously.

Among other performances, the Bavarian State Opera presented a new production of the work in the original French version in 2016, with Elīna Garanča, tenor Matthew Polenzani and Mariusz Kwiecień in the leading roles.

Roles

Synopsis 
Time: 1340
Place: Royaume de Castille

A love triangle involving the King of Castile, Alfonso XI, his mistress ('the favourite') Leonora, and her lover Fernando, the story unfolds against the background of the Moorish invasions of Spain and power struggles between church and state.

Act 1 
Scene 1

In the Monastery of St James, the monks are making their way to worship. Superior Balthazar (bass), father of the Queen of Castile, enters with Fernand (tenor). Balthazar knows that Fernand is preoccupied by something. Fernand confesses that he has fallen in love with a beautiful, but as yet unknown, lady. His faith in God remains, but he wishes to leave the monastery in search of her. Balthazar angrily sends Fernand out of the monastery, warning him of the dangers of the outside world. He predicts that Fernand will one day return to the cloisters, a disappointed if wiser man.

Scene 2

Fernand has found his lady, Léonor (mezzo-soprano), declared his love and received it in return, but he is still unaware of her real identity. She has arranged to meet him on the island of Leon, to which he is brought blindfolded by boat. He is met by Inès (soprano), her companion, who impresses upon him the need for secrecy. Léonor enters. She tells him that they can never marry and that they must not meet again, but nevertheless hands him a document to help him in his future. Shortly afterwards the arrival of the King is announced and Léonor leaves. Fernand is left to speculate about her elevated social position. Reading the document she has left him, he finds a commission in the army – an opportunity for advancement.

Act 2 
Alphonse (baritone) has defeated the Moors and taken Alcazar. In conversation with the courtier Don Gaspar (tenor), the King expresses his pleasure at Fernand's bravery. Alone, the King expresses his love for Léonor and his desire to divorce the Queen and marry her. He realizes that this will provoke the opposition of his powerful father-in-law Balthazar who is ultimately backed by the Pope. Léonor enters and expresses her anguish at remaining his mistress rather than his Queen. The King suspects that he is losing her affection. Don Gaspar enters with news that a letter has been discovered revealing that Léonor has a lover. She makes no denial, but at that moment Balthazar enters intent on forcing the King to abandon his plans for the royal divorce.

Act 3 
Alphonse is to honour Fernand for his role in the war. He asks Fernand what reward he would like and Fernand asks to marry the woman who has inspired him in his bravery. Alphonse asks who she is and Fernand points to Léonor. The King is astonished to learn that Fernand is his successful rival. In an abrupt change of mind, he orders Fernand and Léonor to marry within one hour. Léonor is left with mixed feelings of apprehension and delight. She decides that Fernand must be informed about her past and sends Inès to him. However, unknown to Léonor, Inès is arrested before she can see him. Fernand only learns the truth after the wedding ceremony. Considering himself dishonoured by the King he breaks his sword, leaves Léonor and entrusts himself to Balthazar.

Act 4 
Balthazar's daughter, the Queen, has died of jealousy and grief, and her body has been sent to him at the Monastery of St James. Prayers are being said for her repose. Fernand is preparing to enter his new religious life. Léonor enters in a state of exhaustion and faints before the cross. At first Fernand rejects her, but eventually moved by her love and sincerity, he is willing to give himself to her again, but it is too late, Léonor collapses once more and dies in his arms.

Arrangements 
In 1840, Richard Wagner made arrangements of the work for piano, for flute, and for a violin duo.

Antonio Pasculli composed a concerto on themes from the opera for oboe and piano/orchestra (c. 1879).

Recordings

References

Further reading
Allitt, John Stewart (1991), Donizetti: in the light of Romanticism and the teaching of Johann Simon Mayr, Shaftesbury: Element Books (UK); Rockport, Massachusetts: Element (USA)
Ashbrook, William (1982), Donizetti and His Operas, Cambridge University Press. 
Ashbrook, William and Sarah Hibberd (2001), in Holden, Amanda (ed.), The New Penguin Opera Guide, New York: Penguin Putnam. . pp. 224 – 247.
Black, John (1982), Donizetti’s Operas in Naples, 1822–1848. London: The Donizetti Society.
Loewenberg, Alfred (1970). Annals of Opera, 1597–1940, 2nd edition. Rowman and Littlefield
Osborne, Charles, (1994), The Bel Canto Operas of Rossini, Donizetti, and Bellini, Portland, Oregon: Amadeus Press. 
Sadie, Stanley, (ed.); John Tyrell (exec. ed.) (2004), The New Grove Dictionary of Music and Musicians. 2nd edition. London: Macmillan. (hardcover).   (eBook).
 Weinstock, Herbert (1963), Donizetti and the World of Opera in Italy, Paris, and Vienna in the First Half of the Nineteenth Century, New York: Pantheon Books.

External links
 
 Donizetti Society (London) website
 Libretto in Stanford University's OperaGlass (French)
 Libretto (French)
 Vocal score with Italian text
 , Katherine Ciesinski 

Operas by Gaetano Donizetti
French-language operas
Grand operas
Operas
1840 operas
Operas set in Spain
Operas set in the 14th century
Opera world premieres at the Paris Opera
Operas based on plays
Cultural depictions of Spanish kings